Brugmansia aurea, the golden angel's trumpet, is a species of flowering plant in the nightshade family Solanaceae, endemic to Ecuador. Since March 2014, it has been listed as Extinct in the Wild by the IUCN but before that, it was listed as Vulnerable.

Despite being declared extinct in its native range, Brugmansia aurea is a popular ornamental and is widely cultivated, like the other members of its genus. The large, pendent, trumpet-shaped yellow or white blooms appear in summer and autumn in the Northern Hemisphere. The pleasant fragrance is strongest in the evening.

Etymology
The Latin specific epithet aurea means "golden".

Cultivation
Several cultivars exist, notably 'Grand Marnier' with peach-coloured flowers. It dislikes temperatures below , but may be placed outside in a sheltered spot during the summer months.

Synonyms
Brugmansia affinis
Datura aurea
Datura affinis

Toxicity
All parts of the plant are poisonous.

Uses 

It is used as a hallucinogen. Its most potent cultivar is Culebra Borrachero, which has a high concentration of the psychoactive scopolamine. It has also been used as a truth serum. Borrachero loosely translates to "get-you-drunk", and scopolamine is also known as Devil's Breath and burundanga.

References

aurea
Endemic flora of Ecuador
Vulnerable plants
Garden plants of South America
Taxonomy articles created by Polbot